The 9th Soviet Antarctic Expedition was the Soviet Antarctic Expedition that ran from 1963 to 16 March 1965.

The expedition was led by Dr. Mikhail Somov. This expedition featured the first British exchange scientist, a glaciologist.

Two ships carried the expedition from the Baltic sea to Antarctica, the Ob, an icebreaker and the Estonia, a passenger liner.

Research
Research during the expedition was split into two groups. The first being geophysical; seismology, geomagnetism, earth currents, aurora, cosmic rays, radio propagation, aerology and meteorology. The second group was more fieldwork based; mapping new land, oceanography, geology and glaciology etc.

References
 Swithbank, C. (December 1966) "A Year with the Russians in Antarctica" in The Geographical Journal, 132(4):463–74

 09
Antarctic Expedition 09
Antarctic Expedition 09
Antarctic Expedition 09
Soviet Union–United Kingdom relations
1963 in Antarctica
1964 in Antarctica
1965 in Antarctica